The canton of Villars-les-Dombes is an administrative division in eastern France. At the French canton reorganisation which came into effect in March 2015, the canton was expanded from 10 to 25 communes:
 
Ambérieux-en-Dombes
Ars-sur-Formans
Baneins
Birieux
Bouligneux
Chaleins
Chaneins
Civrieux
Fareins
Francheleins
Lapeyrouse
Lurcy
Messimy-sur-Saône
Mionnay
Monthieux
Rancé
Relevant
Saint-André-de-Corcy
Sainte-Olive
Saint-Jean-de-Thurigneux
Saint-Marcel
Saint-Trivier-sur-Moignans
Savigneux
Villars-les-Dombes  
Villeneuve

Demographics

See also
Cantons of the Ain department 
Communes of France

References

Cantons of Ain